General Berger may refer to:

David H. Berger (born 1959), U.S. Marine Corps four-star general
Gottlob Berger (1896–1975), German Waffen-SS lieutenant general
Lothar Berger (1900–1971), German Wehrmacht major general

See also
General Burger (disambiguation)